Adolf Weber (19 June 1829 - 17 July 1915) was a German ophthalmologist.

Weber was born in Giessen. He was a disciple and friend of Albrecht von Graefe. He died in Darmstadt.

References

1829 births
1915 deaths
German ophthalmologists